"Candidatus Kopriimonas" is a genus of  bacteria from the family of Rhodobacteraceae. Kopriimonas byunsanensis has been isolated from a marine biofilm.

References

Alphaproteobacteria
Bacteria genera
Monotypic bacteria genera